Byuksung College was a private technical college located in Gimje, North Jeolla province, in southwestern South Korea. In 2012 now-Ministry of Education ordered the closure of the college as it failed to implement meaningful policies and changes in response to audits conducted by the Ministry and Board of Audit and Inspection. The college officially closed in 2014 after it lost all legal battles and decided not to bring the case to the Supreme Court. 

The graduating class of 2004 included 439 students.

Academic departments
Car Service
Machine Design
Data Communication
Electronic Circuit Design
Automatic Systems
Software Development
Office Data Systems
Interior Design
Visual Multimedia Design
Architecture
Construction Safety
Environmental Civil Engineering
Broadcasting
Child Welfare
Media English

History

The school was founded as Byuksung Technical College (벽성전문대학) in 1995, and changed its name to simply Byuksung College in 1998.

See also
List of colleges and universities in South Korea
Education in South Korea

External links
Official school website, in Korean and English

References 

Universities and colleges in North Jeolla Province
Gimje
1995 establishments in South Korea
Educational institutions established in 1995
2014 disestablishments in South Korea
Educational institutions disestablished in 2014
Defunct universities and colleges in South Korea